Mayfield School is located in the Goodmayes district of the London Borough of Redbridge and in the post town of Dagenham.

There are 12 forms in year 7, 8 and 9 and 10 forms in year 10 and 11. There are around 30 pupils in each class. There are 8 form groups for the sixth form students, with 20 students or fewer in each form.

Facilities include school libraries, specialist Drama, Mathematics, Music and IT rooms, MFL department, Art rooms, Science Laboratories, and humanities such as; business, geography, history and R.S.

Notable former students include singer Jessica Ellen Cornish, known as Jessie J, who attended the school from 1999 until 2004.

References

Secondary schools in the London Borough of Redbridge
Educational institutions established in 1978
1978 establishments in England
Foundation schools in the London Borough of Redbridge